Gábor Alfréd Fehérvári (born 8 April 1990), known by his stage name Freddie, is a Hungarian singer. He first came to prominence after placing fourth in the first season of the Hungarian version of Rising Star. He later became the Hungarian representative in the Eurovision Song Contest 2016.

Career
Freddie's grandfather was Hungarian football coach Alfréd Fehérvári (1925–2007). Freddie studied at a commercial college before his music career, and worked as an assistant in Győr. By 2010, he had not only sung but also played guitar in small bands. Freddie first performed professionally in the Hungarian version of Rising Star. He reached the top twelve, then top six and then in the top four qualifiers. In the finals, he finished in fourth place. After Rising Star, collaborating with András Kállay-Saunders, Freddie performed his first original song, "Mary Joe", and reached the Petőfi Radio Top 30 list. It became one of the domestic summer hits of 2015. He began performing under his stage name Freddie in Autumn 2015.

In December 2015, it was announced that Freddie would participate in A Dal 2016 with the song "Pioneer". He won A Dal and represented his home country in the Eurovision Song Contest 2016 in May 2016, reaching the final and coming in 19th place overall. He also hosted A Dal 2018, along with Krisztina Rátonyi.

Discography

Singles

Notes

References

1990 births
21st-century Hungarian male singers
Hungarian pop singers
Musicians from Budapest
English-language singers from Hungary
Eurovision Song Contest entrants for Hungary
Eurovision Song Contest entrants of 2016
Living people